Javier Mariona Jacutin (born 17 October 2004) is a professional footballer who plays as a striker for USL Championship club Oakland Roots and their reserve team Project 51O. Born in the United States and of Salvadoran and Filipino descent, he is a youth international for El Salvador.

Early and personal life
Mariona was born in Los Altos, California to a Salvadoran father, Rodrigo Mariona (son of Salvadoran football legend Salvador Mariona), and a Filipino mother, former tennis player Marisue Jacutin (daughter of Dicky and Suzette Jacutin). He has one sister, 5-star tennis recruit Bella Jacutin-Mariona. As a child, he enjoyed food, watching extreme sports (he is a fan of Travis Pastrana), and playing football, tennis, taekwondo, skateboarding and golf. At age six, he played for a 7 to 8-year-old football team because of his "superior talent". According to his mother, "Javier loves sinigang, nilagang baka, adobo, pancit and he’s a big rice fan! Javier completely understands Spanish and some Visayan, but answers back in English since it is the language commonly spoken at home." When asked what he would do if not a footballer, she said "Javier the Monster Truck Driver". At just twelve years old, he was already receiving offers from European clubs.

Club career 
Mariona was signed as a USL Academy player by Oakland Roots on 24 July 2021. He made his debut as a late substitute in a 3–1 win against Tacoma Defiance on 29 August. He made his UPSL debut for Project 51O the next day, wearing the number 10 shirt and scoring the only goal for his side in a 1–1 draw against MCSC Jaguars.

References 

2004 births
Living people
People from Los Altos, California
Soccer players from California
Citizens of El Salvador through descent
American soccer players
Salvadoran footballers
Association football forwards
Oakland Roots SC players
USL Championship players
El Salvador under-20 international footballers
Salvadoran people of Filipino descent
Sportspeople of Filipino descent
American sportspeople of Salvadoran descent
American sportspeople of Filipino descent
De Anza Force players